Pao Hsin-hsuan (born 1 September 1992), known as Michelle Pao, is a Taiwanese footballer who plays as a midfielder for Taiwan Mulan Football League club Taichung Blue Whale and the Chinese Taipei women's national team. Pao played collegiate soccer for Pepperdine University.

Youth career
Michelle Pao played for Pepperdine during her college years between 2010 and 2014; and is the first player of the university to earn four-time All-WCC first team honors; and was also four-time NSCAA All-West Region pick.

Professional career

Vittsjö GIK
Pao was the 24th selection in 2014 NWSL College Draft by Sky Blue FC. However, Michelle Pao did not join Sky Blue and instead went to play for Vittsjö GIK in Sweden.

Nojima Stella Kanagawa Sagamihara
In February 2016, Japan Women's Football League Division 2 club Nojima Stella Kanagawa Sagamihara announced that the club had signed Pao. Pao finished the 2016 season as the top scorer with 11 goals in the 2016 L. League Division 2. Nojima Stella Kanagawa Sagamihara finished first in the Division 2 and thus promoted first in history to the Division 1.

On 8 December 2017, Pao announced her retirement from professional soccer career at the end of the 2017 season.

Taiwan women's league
Since 2018 season, she joined Taichung Blue Whale, a semi-professional club playing in Taiwan Mulan Football League.
Due to cancellation of matches starting in May 2021 just after her 29th birthday in September she said would be leaving Taichung Blue Whale to return to California.

International
Michelle Pao played for Chinese Taipei women's national football team in 2016 AFC Women's Olympic Qualifying Tournament and scored a goal in the second round against Jordan women's national football team.

International goals

Honors

Individual
 2016 L. League Division 2 : Top scorers

Club
Nojima Stella Kanagawa Sagamihara 
 2016 L. League Division 2 : Champion

Personal
Michelle is the daughter of Yao-kuo Pao and Liven Lin and has two siblings, Wayne and Jessie; and attended Monta Vista High School in  Cupertino, California. She graduated from Pepperdine University majoring in sports medicine.

References

External links 
 

1992 births
Living people
American women's soccer players
Chinese Taipei women's international footballers
Damallsvenskan players
Expatriate women's footballers in Japan
Expatriate women's footballers in Sweden
Footballers at the 2018 Asian Games
Nojima Stella Kanagawa Sagamihara players
Pepperdine Waves women's soccer players
NJ/NY Gotham FC draft picks
Sportspeople of Chinese descent
Taiwanese women's footballers
Vittsjö GIK players
Women's association football midfielders
Asian Games competitors for Chinese Taipei
People from Hsinchu County
Nadeshiko League players